The 1931 French Championships (now known as the French Open) was a tennis tournament that took place on the outdoor clay courts at the Stade Roland-Garros in Paris, France. The tournament ran from 22 May until 31 May. It was the 36th staging of the French Championships and the second Grand Slam tournament of the year. Jean Borotra and Cilly Aussem won the singles titles.

Finals

Men's singles

 Jean Borotra defeated  Christian Boussus  2–6, 6–4, 7–5, 6–4

Women's singles

 Cilly Aussem defeated  Betty Nuthall 8–6, 6–1

Men's doubles
 George Lott  /  John Van Ryn defeated  Vernon Kirby  /  Norman Farquharson  6–4, 6–3, 6–4

Women's doubles
 Eileen Bennett Whittingstall  /  Betty Nuthall defeated  Cilly Aussem  /  Elizabeth Ryan 9–7, 6–2

Mixed doubles
 Betty Nuthall  /  Patrick Spence defeated  Dorothy Shepherd Barron /  Bunny Austin 6–3, 5–7, 6–3

References

External links
 French Open official website

French Championships
French Championships (tennis) by year
French Champ
May 1931 sports events
1931 in Paris